Michelle Goh (born 9 September 1973), is a Singaporean actress and entrepreneur. She left MediaCorp in 1998 and has been staying in Canada for 10 years.

Acting career 
Goh was approached by Eric Khoo while dancing at Zouk, a Singapore nightclub, for the role of Bunny for Mee Pok Man. After filming the film, Goh signed with Television Corporation of Singapore (TCS) for three years. She finished the contract and left Singapore.

Business career 
Goh founded Float House in 2014, a floating therapy wellness centre at Novena Medical Centre. Float House ceased business on 2016.

Personal life 
After finishing her contract with TCS, Goh left Singapore for Vancouver in 1998. She returned to Singapore after 10 years in 2008.

Filmography

Film

Television

Awards and nominations

References

External links
 

1973 births
Living people
Singaporean actresses